Mythunga is a genus of anhanguerid pterosaur from the late Early Cretaceous of Australia. Fossil remains of Mythunga dated back to the Albian stage of the Early Cretaceous, and the animal itself was found to be a close relative of another Australian anhanguerid called Ferrodraco.

Discovery and naming
Mythunga is known from a partial skull, holotype QM F18896 found in April 1991 by Philip Gilmore in marine rocks of the late Albian-age Toolebuc Formation at Dunluce Station west of Hughenden, Queensland. Only the middle snout and corresponding parts of the lower jaws are known, including the rear of a left premaxilla, the lower parts of both maxillae, the rear dentaries and a right splenial. They were three-dimensionally preserved, associated in a chalk nodule. It represents a subadult individual. The fossil was prepared by Angela Hatch of the Queensland Museum, both by mechanical means and by an acid bath.

The type species Mythunga camara was named and described by Ralph Molnar and R. A. Thulborn in 2007/2008. The generic name is that of the constellation Orion in the local aboriginal language. The specific name, from Latin camera, "room", refers to the camerate air spaces in the bone.

Mythunga was redescribed by Adele Pentland and Stephen Poropat in 2018, benefiting from further preparation of the specimen. At that time it was still the most completely known pterosaur of Australia. No more than twenty pterosaur fossils were known from that continent, most of them teeth and bone fragments.

Description

In 2007, two autapomorphies were suggested, unique derived traits. Firstly, the teeth in the rear dentary of the lower jaw were relatively tall (half the depth of the supporting bone at that point). Secondly, the three hindmost maxillary teeth were widely spaced. In 2018 however, the first trait was rejected, as it could not be reliably established where the dentary ended. Another autapomorphy was now proposed: the outer sides of the jaws are undulating because of the bulging tooth sockets.  

As with most pterosaurs, the snout was hollow, with a supporting internal boxwork of bone, as could be observed at breaks. The jugal bone apparently extended to a point below the front of the large skull opening, the nasoantorbital fenestra. There are at least eight teeth in each maxilla. That is also the minimal number in the dentary. The teeth are relatively short, conical and moderately recurved. Their cross-section is oval. They are widely spaced at equal distances.

Classification
In 2007, Mythunga was provisionally thought to belong to a group of plesiomorphic, and thus possibly basal, pterodactyloids: the Archaeopterodactyloidea. In 2010, Alexander Kellner and colleagues placed Mythunga within the Anhangueridae. In 2018, it was recovered by a cladistic analysis in the Anhangueria.

The results of a phylogenetic analysis by Pentland et al. (2019) have recovered Mythunga as a member of the family Ornithocheiridae, more precisely within the subfamily Ornithocheirinae as the sister taxon of Ferrodraco. However, a study made by Borja Holgado and Rodrigo Pêgas in 2020 had again recovered Mythunga within the family Anhangueridae, more precisely within the subfamily Tropeognathinae.

Topology 1: Pentland et al. (2019).

Topology 2: Holgado & Pêgas (2020).

See also
 List of pterosaur genera
 Timeline of pterosaur research

References

Early Cretaceous pterosaurs
Early Cretaceous reptiles of Australia
Fossil taxa described in 2008
Pterosaurs of Australia
Taxa named by Ralph Molnar
Pteranodontoids